The Mechanic is a 2011 American action thriller film directed by Simon West, starring Jason Statham, Ben Foster, Tony Goldwyn, Donald Sutherland, James Logan, Mini Andén, Jeff Chase, and Christa Campbell. Written by Lewis John Carlino and Richard Wenk, it is a remake of the 1972 film of the same name. Statham stars as Arthur Bishop, a professional assassin who specializes in making his hits look like accidents, suicides and petty criminals's acts. 

It was released in the U.S. and Canada on  2011 where it was praised for its action sequences and Statham's performance. A sequel, Mechanic: Resurrection, was released on August 26, 2016.

Plot
Hitman Arthur Bishop sneaks into the home of a Colombian cartel boss and drowns him in his own pool. Upon returning home to Louisiana, he meets with his friend and mentor Harry McKenna, who pays Bishop for his work. Bishop is then assigned to kill Harry. Bishop's employer Dean confirms by phone that the contract is correct, whereupon Bishop requests a face-to-face meeting. Dean tells him about a failed mission in South Africa, in which several assassins were killed. Dean reveals that only he and Harry knew the details of the mission, and that Harry had been paid for the contract details. Reluctantly, Bishop kills Harry with the latter's own gun and makes it look like a carjacking. At the funeral, Bishop encounters Harry's son Steve, where he stops from trying to kill a would-be carjacker in a misguided attempt at vengeance. 

Following this, Steve asks Bishop to train him as a hitman. Adopting a chihuahua, he instructs Steve to take the dog with him to a coffee shop each day at the same time. As Steve settles into a routine, Bishop escalates their training, taking him to observe a contract killing. The target, Burke frequents the coffee shop and eventually invites Steve out for drinks. Bishop instructs Steve to slip a large dose of Rohypnol into Burke's drink to cause an overdose, but Steve ignores the instructions and goes with Burke to his apartment. When Burke begins to undress, Steve attempts to strangle him with a belt as he had seen Bishop do on a former assignment. Burke fights back, using his size advantage and experience, but Steve manages to kill Burke after a lengthy fight. Dean expresses disapproval of Bishop's usage of Steve, which violated the rules of contract arrangement. 

Bishop's next contract is to kill cult leader Andrew Vaughn, whom he plans to inject with adrenaline to simulate a heart attack, for which the paramedics would administer a fatal dose of epinephrine. While Bishop and Steve are preparing for the hit, Vaughn's doctor arrives and administers an IV of ketamine, which would inhibit the adrenaline's effects. The two decide to suffocate him instead, but are discovered after killing Vaughn and are forced into a shootout with the guards. After the hit, Bishop and Steve fly home separately. At the airport, Bishop finds a supposed victim of the mission that Harry allegedly sold out. He confronts the hitman, who tells Bishop that he was paid by Dean to kill the others in South Africa and fake his own death, so that Dean could engineer the failed mission to cover up his own shady dealings. He also reveals that Dean framed Harry and tricked Bishop into killing him. He then attempts to kill Bishop, who ultimately kills him in the ensuing struggle. 

Bishop is later ambushed by Dean's henchmen, and after killing them, he discovers that Dean was behind the hit. Bishop calls Steve, only to find that Steve has been ambushed. After Bishop helps Steve to kill his attackers, he finds his father's gun and realizes that Bishop killed Harry. Bishop and Steve kill Dean in an ambush. When they stop for gas, Steve floods the ground with fuel while pretending to fill the tank before shooting the gas, blowing up the truck with Bishop seemingly still inside. Steve returns to Bishop's house and performs two actions that Bishop told him not to do: play a record on the turntable and take the 1966 Jaguar E-Type. As he drives away, Steve finds a note from Bishop telling him that he was dead. Presumably realizing that the car is rigged with a bomb, Steve gives one last laugh before the car explodes, killing him. Bishop's house is then destroyed by an explosion. Back at the gas station, a security video reveals that Bishop had escaped from the truck, seconds before the explosion. Bishop gets into a spare truck and drives away.

Cast

 Jason Statham as Arthur Bishop
 Ben Foster as Steve McKenna
 Tony Goldwyn as Dean Sanderson
 Donald Sutherland as Harry McKenna
 Jeff Chase as Burke
 John McConnell as Andrew Vaughn
 Mini Andén as Sarah
 Stuart Greer as Ralph
 Christa Campbell as Kelly
 Lance E. Nichols as Henry
 J.D. Evermore as Gun Runner
 David Leitch as Sebastian
 Mark Nutter as John Finch, Dean's Bodyguard
 Lara Grice as Mrs. Finch
 Ada Michelle Loridans as Finch's Daughter
 Katarzyna Wolejnio as Maria
 James Logan as Jorge Lara
 Eddie J. Fernandez as Lara's Guard
 Joshua Bridgewater as Raymond, The Carjacker
 Choop as Arthur The Dog

Production

Development
Irwin Winkler and Robert Chartoff, producers of the 1972 original Mechanic, sought to make an update. Pre-rights to the remake were sold in February 2009 at the Berlin Film Festival. (Variety reported that the screenplay was written by Karl Gajdusek.)

Casting
Director Simon West and Jason Statham were announced as part of the project three months later. Ben Foster and Donald Sutherland were cast alongside Statham in October 2009.

Filming
Filming locations included St. Tammany Parish, the World Trade Center in downtown New Orleans and the Algiers Seafood Market.

Music

The soundtrack music is by Mark Isham, with two exceptions:

 Franz Schubert's 1827 Trio No. 2 in E-flat major for piano, violin, and violoncello, D. 929, which is played when Bishop returns from a mission. The record was released on January 25, 2011, by MIM Records.
 "Better Off Dead" by Linnzi Zaorski, herself playing the "Jazz Club Singer".

Release

Theatrical
Millennium Films sold U.S. distribution rights to CBS Films for the release. It was expected to perform well with male audiences, with its release a week before Super Bowl XLV. In the United Kingdom, the distribution rights were sold to Lionsgate.

TV advertisement ban
In June 2011 the UK's Advertising Standards Authority banned an advertisement for the film from being broadcast on British television. The ban followed complaints from 13 viewers regarding a screening of the advert during the teen show Glee. In its ruling, the authority found that although the advert was shown post-watershed, it was likely that a large number of viewers under the age of 16 would have been watching Glee at the time, and criticized the "stream of violent imagery" portrayed in the advert.

Reception

Box office
The film grossed  on its opening weekend in the U.S. and Canada.

Critical response
The Mechanic received mixed reviews from critics. Review aggregator Rotten Tomatoes gives the film an approval rating of 53%, based on 156 reviews, with a rating average of 5.6/10. The site's critical consensus reads, "Jason Statham and Ben Foster turn in enjoyable performances, but this superficial remake betrays them with mind-numbing violence and action thriller cliches." 
On Metacritic, which assigns a weighted average score to reviews from mainstream critics, the film received an average score of 49 out of 100, based on 35 critics, indicating "mixed or average reviews".

Roger Ebert awarded the film two out of four stars and said, "Audiences have been drilled to accept noise and movement as entertainment. It is done so well one almost forgets to ask why it has been done at all."

Sequel

Dennis Gansel directed a sequel, with Jason Statham returning as Arthur Bishop.

References

External links

 
 
 
 
 

2011 films
2011 action thriller films
American action thriller films
CBS Films films
Remakes of American films
Films shot in New Orleans
Films directed by Simon West
Films about contract killing
Films produced by Robert Chartoff
Films produced by Irwin Winkler
Films with screenplays by Lewis John Carlino
Films with screenplays by Richard Wenk
Films scored by Mark Isham
Films shot in Detroit
The Mechanic films
2010s English-language films
2010s American films